Sejad Salihović (born 8 October 1984) is a Bosnian professional footballer who plays for 1899 Hoffenheim II. He spent most of his career playing for 1899 Hoffenheim in the German Bundesliga. He also played for Hertha BSC, Beijing Renhe, St. Gallen and Hamburger SV.

For eight years, from 2007 to 2015, Salihović played for the Bosnia and Herzegovina national team, earning 47 caps and scoring 4 goals for the team. He represented the nation at their first major tournament, the 2014 FIFA World Cup.

Club career

Early career
Salihović began his career in the youth teams of lower-league sides Minerva Berlin and Hertha Zehlendorf. In the 2000–01 season, he was transferred to Hertha BSC, where he played for the U17 and U19 teams before eventually entering the reserve team in 2003.

Hertha BSC
Salihović was promoted to the first team in 2004. He made his professional debut in a Bundesliga match against Hamburger SV on 26 September 2004, which ended in a 1–2 defeat.

1899 Hoffenheim
In 2006, Salihović was transferred to 1899 Hoffenheim. In his first season, the team played in Regionalliga Süd, at the time third tier league in Germany. At the end of the season, they managed to get promoted to 2. Bundesliga.

He was rated by kicker as the best player of 2. Bundesliga in 2007–08 season with the best over-all grades, as 1899 Hoffenheim were once again promoted, this time to Bundesliga.

Salihović helped 1899 Hoffenheim finish on the top of the table heading into the winter break in their first Bundesliga season. However, they could not continue in the same rhythm, finishing season only seventh.

At the end of the 2012–13 season, Salihović scored two late penalties against Borussia Dortmund to secure relegation play-off matches, ultimately saving his team from being relegated.

His last seasons at 1899 Hoffenheim were plagued by injuries, limiting his playing time and performance.

He left 1889 Hoffenheim in 2015, after 9 years, becoming the record appearance maker in club's history.

Beijing Renhe
On 7 June 2015, 1899 Hoffenheim announced on their official website that Salihović would leave the club to join Chinese Super League side Beijing Renhe.

St. Gallen
In February 2017, Salihović signed with Swiss Super League side St. Gallen until the end of the season. As his contract was not renewed, he left the club on a free transfer in June 2017.

Hamburger SV
On 13 September 2017, Salihović signed a one-year contract with Hamburger SV, returning to Bundesliga after more than two years. He made his debut on 15 September, in a 0–2 loss against Hannover 96. Salihović scored his first goal against Mainz 05, in an eventual 2–3 loss. At the end of the season, Salihović left the club as his contract was not renewed.

Retirement
On 4 April 2019, Salihović's adviser Tolga Dirican announced that despite offers from many 2. Bundesliga clubs, Salihović decided to end his career.
In 2021, he returned to professional football, and played a game with 1899 Hoffenheim II.

International career
Salihović was a regular member of Bosnia and Herzegovina under-21 team. During October 2006, while playing for the Bosnia and Herzegovina under-21 team, Salihović scored twice in the team's 2–3 aggregate loss to Czech Republic under-21 in the play-offs for 2007 UEFA European Under-21 Football Championship. Both his goals were shots from over 25 meters out.

Since then, Salihović has been promoted to the senior side and has become an important member of the team. He debuted on 13 October 2007 in a 2–3 UEFA Euro 2008 qualifying loss to Greece, and scored his first goal against Oman on 9 June 2009 in a friendly game. Although his favorite position is in midfield, he has often been used as a left back in lack of other options. Due to unsporting behavior in game against Portugal during 2010 FIFA World Cup qualification play-offs, Salihović was suspended for four games, missing the UEFA Euro 2012 qualification games against Luxembourg, France, Albania and Romania. He returned for a friendly match against Slovakia, which Bosnia won 3–2 in Bratislava.

In June 2014, he was named in Bosnia and Herzegovina's squad for the 2014 FIFA World Cup, the country's first big competition. He played at all three games that Bosnia played at the World Cup. In the 2–1 and 1–0 losses against Argentina and Nigeria and in a 3–1 win against Iran.

After Bosnia failed to qualify to the 2016 UEFA Euro, Salihović, even though he never announced it, left the national team.

Personal life
Salihović and his family migrated to Berlin in 1992, right before the Bosnian War started. In June 2009, after 17 years, Sejad visited his hometown of Zvornik where his parents Ismet and Fadila were renovating their home. His hobbies include reading, playing football, and spending time with his family.

On 15 December 2014, Salihović married his girlfriend. In April 2015, the couple became parents of a boy. The couple also divorced officially in 2019 after many scandals.

Style of play
Salihović had a powerful shot with his left foot and was a free-kick specialist right up to his retirement.

Career statistics

Club

International

International goals
Scores and results list Bosnia and Herzegovina's goal tally first.

References

External links

1984 births
Living people
People from Zvornik
Bosniaks of Bosnia and Herzegovina
Bosnia and Herzegovina Muslims
Bosnia and Herzegovina refugees
Bosnia and Herzegovina emigrants to Germany
Bosnia and Herzegovina footballers
Bosnia and Herzegovina under-21 international footballers
Bosnia and Herzegovina international footballers
Bosnia and Herzegovina expatriate footballers
Association football midfielders
Hertha BSC II players
Hertha BSC players
TSG 1899 Hoffenheim players
TSG 1899 Hoffenheim II players
Beijing Renhe F.C. players
FC St. Gallen players
Hamburger SV players
Regionalliga players
Bundesliga players
2. Bundesliga players
Chinese Super League players
China League One players
Swiss Super League players
Expatriate footballers in Germany
Expatriate footballers in China
Expatriate footballers in Switzerland
Bosnia and Herzegovina expatriate sportspeople in Germany
Bosnia and Herzegovina expatriate sportspeople in China
Bosnia and Herzegovina expatriate sportspeople in Switzerland
2014 FIFA World Cup players